The Green Party of Prince Edward Island leadership election took place on 2–3 November, Prince Edward Island.

On 12 July 2012, Sharon Labchuk resigned from the leadership of the Green Party of PEI, triggering a leadership election. An interim leader and the details of the leadership election are to be announced.

On 3 November 2012, Peter Bevan-Baker was elected leader.

None of the above
The None of the above ballot option was available to members.

Timeline

 12 July 2012 Sharon Labchuk resigned from the leadership after leading the party for 7 years, and was the founding leader.
 17 July 2012 Darcie Lanthier is appointed interim Leader. She says the leadership convention will be held in the fall.
 2 & 3 November 2012 Leadership convention in Charlottetown.
 3 November 2012 Peter Bevan-Baker was elected leader.

Candidates

 Peter Bevan-Baker

References

External links
 

Green Party of Prince Edward Island leadership election
PEI, 2012
Leadership election, 2012
Green Party of leadership election
Green Party of Prince Edward Island leadership election
Green Party of Prince Edward Island leadership election